Nipponotrophon elegantissimus is a species of sea snail, a marine gastropod mollusk in the family Muricidae, the murex snails or rock snails.

Description

Distribution

References

 Hu C.H. [Chung Hung] & Lee X.F. [Xiu Fen]. (1991). Fossil molluscs from the Pliocene marls of Mt Maan, Henchun Peninsula]. Fauna of Taiwan mollusk fossils, 1(2): 67-174. National Museum of Natural Science, Taichung

Gastropods described in 1971
Nipponotrophon